The 2021 CONCACAF Gold Cup Final was a soccer match to determine the winners of 2021 CONCACAF Gold Cup. The match was the sixteenth final of the Gold Cup, a biennial tournament contested by the men's national teams of the member associations of CONCACAF and one invited team to decide the champion of North America, Central America, and the Caribbean. The match was held at Allegiant Stadium in Paradise, Nevada, United States, on August 1, 2021, and was contested by hosts the United States and the defending champions Mexico.

It was the seventh Gold Cup final to be contested by Mexico and the United States, and the second consecutive. From the previous six finals, Mexico won five times – in 1993, 1998, 2009, 2011, and 2019. The United States only won in 2007 prior to this match.

The United States won the final 1–0, with the lone goal scored by Miles Robinson in extra time for their seventh Gold Cup title.

Venue

The final was held at Allegiant Stadium in Paradise, Nevada, United States, located in the Las Vegas metropolitan area. It was the first major international tournament to be played at the venue, which was built for the Las Vegas Raiders of the National Football League. It was also the first Gold Cup match to be played in the Las Vegas area. The match was played in front of a full-capacity crowd after the easing of COVID-19 restrictions; CONCACAF began sale of general seating tickets on June 11, 2021, and sold out their allotment within 90 minutes.

Referee
The referee in charge of the match was Said Martínez from Honduras. Martínez, who at the time was 29, was considered amongst the best confederation referees and was appointed along assistant referees, one fellow Honduran and a Nicaraguan as linesmen. Goal.com considered the match, the most important of his international career, which began in 2017.

Road to the final

Match

Details

Notes

References

CONCACAF Gold Cup finals
Final
Mexico–United States soccer rivalry
United States men's national soccer team matches
Mexico national football team matches
CONCACAF Gold Cup Final
CONCACAF Gold Cup Final
Sports competitions in Nevada
Soccer in Nevada
Events in Paradise, Nevada